The 3rd Senate district of Wisconsin is one of 33 districts in the Wisconsin State Senate.  Located in southeast Wisconsin, the district is entirely contained within central Milwaukee County.  It comprises much of the city of Milwaukee's near-south side, as well as the village of West Milwaukee and eastern parts of the cities of West Allis and Greenfield.  The district contains landmarks such as American Family Field (home of the Milwaukee Brewers), Walker's Point Historic District, the Mitchell Park Domes, and the historic Forest Home Cemetery.

Current elected officials
Tim Carpenter is the senator representing the 3rd district.  He was first elected in the 2002 general election, and is now serving his sixth term.  Before being elected senator, he was a member of the Wisconsin State Assembly from 1985 to 2003.

Each Wisconsin State Senate district is composed of three State Assembly districts.  The 3rd Senate district comprises the 7th, 8th, and 9th Assembly districts.  The current representatives of those districts are:
 Assembly District 7: Daniel Riemer (D–Milwaukee)
 Assembly District 8: Sylvia Ortiz-Velez (D–Milwaukee)
 Assembly District 9: Marisabel Cabrera (D–Milwaukee)

The district is also located within Wisconsin's 4th congressional district, which is represented by U.S. Representative Gwen Moore.

Past senators

Note: the boundaries of districts have changed over history. Previous politicians of a specific numbered district have represented a completely different geographic area, due to redistricting.

The district has previously been represented by:

See also
 Political subdivisions of Wisconsin

References

External links
Tim Carpenter official campaign site
3rd Senate District, Senator Carpenter in the Wisconsin Blue Book (2005–2006)

Wisconsin State Senate districts
Milwaukee County, Wisconsin
1848 establishments in Wisconsin